Sean Andrews can refer to:

 Sean Andrews (cricketer, born 1973), South African cricketer
 Sean Andrews (cricketer, born 1978), South African cricketer
 Sean Andrews (EastEnders), fictional character on BBC soap opera EastEnders